Tmesisternus canofasciatus is a species of beetle in the family Cerambycidae, being described by the Swedish entomologist Per Olof Christopher Aurivillius in 1927. It was discovered in Papua New Guinea.

References

canofasciatus
Beetles described in 1927